The Arrowhead Lodge, at 34500 Poudre Canyon Hwy., Roosevelt National Forest, in Larimer County, Colorado, served by the post office in unincorporated Bellvue, Colorado, was a resort camp which was built in 1931.  It was listed on the National Register of Historic Places in 1992.

Its main lodge is currently a United States Forest Service visitor's center. Other buildings include 13 historic, Rustic-style cabins.

It is at elevation , about  up Cache la Poudre Canyon.

It is located in Roosevelt National Forest "in the rugged lower montane climax region typical of Colorado's Rocky Mountain eastern slope," on the north bank of the Cache la Poudre River.

See also
National Register of Historic Places listings in Larimer County, Colorado

References

External links

National Register of Historic Places in Larimer County, Colorado
Buildings and structures completed in 1931
Historic districts on the National Register of Historic Places in Colorado
Rustic architecture in Colorado